Rupela bendis is a moth in the family Crambidae. It was described by Carl Heinrich in 1937. It is found in Venezuela and São Paulo, Brazil.

The wingspan is 28–33 mm. The wings are white.

References

Moths described in 1937
Schoenobiinae
Taxa named by Carl Heinrich